Legends in Concert is a live tribute artist production with shows primarily located in Las Vegas, Nevada; Myrtle Beach, South Carolina; Branson, Missouri; Mashantucket, Connecticut; Waikiki, Hawaii; Foley, Alabama and Atlantic City, New Jersey. Legends in Concert features live concerts paying tribute to musical icons of today and yesterday. The show boasts a wide collection of musical tribute artists who resemble and sing like the original artists while being backed by a live band and dancers. Performances are scheduled year round across the globe and its five primary locations in the United States.

Most recently, Legends in Concert has forged a partnership with Elvis Presley Enterprises, helping host several preliminary rounds of the Ultimate Elvis Tribute Artist Contest.

History 
Legends in Concert was founded in 1983 in Las Vegas, Nevada. During that same year, Legends' first show was performed at the Imperial Palace Hotel and Casino in Las Vegas, Nevada. The show is currently owned and produced by On Stage Entertainment, Inc. 2013 marked the 30th Anniversary for Legends in Concert entertainment productions.

The Legends in Concert show has expanded its production to The Legends in Concert Theater in Myrtle Beach, South Carolina; Dick Clark's American Bandstand Theater in Branson, Missouri; Norwegian Cruise Lines newest ship Norwegian Epic; Blue Chip Casino, Hotel and Spa in Michigan City, Indiana; Coushatta Casino in Kinder, Louisiana; Royal Hawaiian Center in Waikiki, Hawaii; Foxwoods Resort Casino in Mashantucket, Connecticut; and Bally's Atlantic City in Atlantic City, New Jersey.

In 2013, Legends in Concert furthered its partnership with Elvis Presley Enterprises, Inc. a joint venture, full-scale touring production presenting a US national tour called  Elvis Lives. The tour presents the music of Elvis throughout the many phases of his career in a live concert featuring 4 Elvis tribute artists. More information on touring dates can be found by visiting Elvis Live Tour.

The pilot production of Legends in Concert in Las Vegas, Nevada, moved from its original location at the Imperial Palace and Hotel Casino to Harrah's Las Vegas on February 23, 2009. In February 2013, Legends in Concert moved to The Flamingo Las Vegas.

The Surfside Beach, SC show, which had been in that location since 1995, moved to the former Club Kryptonite location next to Planet Hollywood at Broadway at the Beach in nearby Myrtle Beach, South Carolina after its final show in the former location on October 6, 2010.

Legends has begun experimenting with international performances.  As of 2016, Legends had touring performances, but no permanent international venues.

Awards 
2007 Tribute Show of the Year – Myrtle Beach Herald
2004, 2005 Celebrity Impersonation Show of The Year – 2004 Myrtle Beach Herald 2005 Myrtle Beach Herald
March 15–20, 2004, proclaimed as "Legends in Concert Week" in honor of the theater's 10th anniversary
 2009, 2010 voted Best Live Music Venue by WMBF-TV Viewers – Myrtle Beach, SC.
 2011 voted 3rd Place Best Live Music Venue Myrtle Beach, South Carolina by WMBF-TV viewers

References

External links 
Legends in Concert

Las Vegas Strip
Myrtle Beach, South Carolina
Tourist attractions in Myrtle Beach, South Carolina
Atlantic City, New Jersey
Tribute bands
Las Vegas shows